Kitterman Corners is an unincorporated community in Clark Township, Perry County, in the U.S. state of Indiana.

Geography

References

Unincorporated communities in Perry County, Indiana
Unincorporated communities in Indiana